F8 (pronounced "fate") is the eighth studio album by American heavy metal band Five Finger Death Punch, released on February 28, 2020. It is the first Five Finger Death Punch album to feature drummer Charlie Engen, who joined the band following the departure of founding drummer Jeremy Spencer, and final album with guitarist Jason Hook. F8 is also the band's first album to be released through Better Noise Music.

Written and recorded from May to October 2019, F8 is considered a "rebirth" of the band, according to guitarist Zoltan Bathory.

Background

On May 9, 2019, the band released a video announcing a "new record in the making". On December 2, 2019, the band released the single, "Inside Out", announcing that their upcoming eighth studio album would be titled F8 and would be released on February 28, 2020. According to the band's lead vocalist Ivan Moody, when talking about lead single "Inside Out" he describes it as his own story about his addiction struggles. As for the record itself he called the record his pardon after what he's been through in terms of his addiction and of his friends that he lost during that time of struggles such as the late Linkin Park vocalist Chester Bennington.

Track listing
All tracks written by Zoltan Bathory, Jason Hook, Ivan Moody and Kevin Churko

Personnel
 Ivan Moody – lead vocals 
 Zoltan Bathory – rhythm guitar
 Jason Hook – lead guitar, backing vocals
 Chris Kael – bass, backing vocals
 Charlie Engen – drums, percussion

Charts

Weekly charts

Year-end charts

References

2020 albums
Five Finger Death Punch albums
Albums produced by Kevin Churko
Nu metal albums by American artists